Dustin Brown (born 8 December 1984) is a German-Jamaican professional tennis player. He rose to fame after beating Rafael Nadal in the 2014 Halle Open and Wimbledon 2015, and is known for his technique, speed, and entertaining playing style, often entertaining the crowd with trick shots. He is also known as "Dreddy" due to his distinctive long dreadlocked hair.

Brown competes mainly on the ATP Challenger Tour, in singles and doubles, having won 31 overall titles. His highest career singles world rank at No. 64 was in October 2016, and doubles world rank at No. 43 in May 2012. Brown is also notable for being one of the only two players to remain undefeated against Rafael Nadal after playing more than one match with him, holding a 2–0 head-to-head record.

Brown has yet to make an ATP tour singles final but has made two semifinals at the 2016 Open Sud de France and the 2016 Swiss Open Gstaad. In doubles, he won two titles on the ATP Tour.

Early life 
Brown was born on 8 December 1984 in Celle, West Germany, a town situated near the city of Hanover. His father Leroy met his German born mother Inge in Jamaica and would settle in Celle for a time. This unusual dual nationality has earned him the nickname "Shabba" based on a line from Jamie Foxx in the 1997 comedy Booty Call where he claimed to be a "Germaican". He also has two half-brothers named Steve and Dean. He played several sports such as football, judo, and handball throughout his childhood. He started playing tennis at the age of 5 but didn't really focus on the sport until the age of eight: "When I made the decision to pursue tennis instead of football, of course I wanted to be successful. I didn't want just to end up playing for a club somewhere." His reported idol growing up was Russian tennis player and former world number 1 Marat Safin. His junior tennis career went well enough to draw the attention of Kim Michael Wittenberg, an American who ran a tennis academy near Hanover. Wittenberg regularly gave Brown lessons, and according to his pupil, he "taught me to play tennis."

At 11 years old, in 1996, the family returned to Jamaica, particularly Montego Bay. The move was motivated in part by the high cost of training in Germany as well as his need to develop discipline on the court: "I was pretty mentally soft when I was young. Anything could happen when I played—I could lose my temper, I got disqualified." In Jamaica, track and field, soccer, and cricket were the sports that commanded the best resources, tennis was played on poorly maintained public courts and with low-quality balls. Nevertheless, he continued to play junior tennis.

In 2004, 20-year-old Brown became unhappy with tennis in Jamaica, his family thought his potential warranted returning to Germany and a Volkswagen campervan that could sleep up to three people set him up. The mobile lodgings enabled him to play in the various European tournaments: "It was a brilliant idea by my parents, otherwise I wouldn't have been able to go on playing. It was a means of competing week in, week out." He also brought in income with his racquet stringing machine, giving other players lower cost service, and letting out his spare mobile accommodations for a night.

Junior career
Brown played his first junior match in August 1999 at the age of 14 at a grade 4 tournament in Jamaica. As a junior, Brown only competed in 2 junior grand slams in 2002 where he made the second round of Junior Wimbledon in singles and the quarterfinals of Junior US Open in doubles. Brown ended his junior career with a high ranking of 61 (attained on March 18, 2002) and a 34–26 record in singles and a high ranking of 116 (attained on November 11, 2002) and a 15–24 record in doubles.

Junior Grand Slam results – Singles:

Australian Open: A (-)
French Open: A (-)
Wimbledon: 2R (2002)
US Open: 1R (2002)

Junior Grand Slam results – Doubles:

Australian Open: A (-)
French Open: A (-)
Wimbledon: 1R (2002)
US Open: QF (2002)

Professional career

2002–2009
Brown officially turned pro in April 2002 at the age of 17 and represented Jamaica early in his career. Between 2002 and 2009, Brown made it to 11 ITF singles finals and 32 ITF doubles finals (winning 3 singles and 16 doubles). These results gradually boosted his ranking overtime.

Brown made his ATP debut at the 2003 Hall of Fame Open after qualifying for the main draw. He lost in the first round to Bob Bryan in three sets.

Brown made his first challenger final at the 2009 Baden Open where he lost to Florian Mayer in straight sets. Three months later, he won his first challenger title at the 2009 Samarkand Challenger defeating Jonathan Dasnières de Veigy in the final. For the rest of 2009, he made four more challenger finals including one doubles final. The results would help push his ranking from 494 at the start of the year to 144 at the end.

2010–2019

2010 is considered to be Brown's breakout year. In his second main circuit appearance after a first-round loss at the Hall of Fame Tennis Championships in 2003, He defeated fourth seed Marco Chiudinelli and No. 139 Laurent Recouderc to reach the quarterfinals of the 2010 SA Tennis Open in Johannesburg, South Africa, where he lost to eventual runner-up Stéphane Robert. He became the second Jamaican after Doug Burke at the 1989 BP National Championships in Wellington, New Zealand, to reach the quarterfinals of a main ATP Tour event.

On May 17, 2010, Brown cracked a singles career top 100 world rank at No. 99.

Brown played his third ATP tour event at the 2010 Aegon Championships (Queen's Club), defeating first-round opponent Frank Dancevic, in three sets; his loss came in the second round to Denis Istomin of Uzbekistan.

By June 2010, a lack of funding and support from the Jamaican Tennis Association tempted him  to switch national association to Great Britain, his paternal grandparents being British. In October 2010 he decided to compete for Germany and his debut event playing under the German flag was Eckental. His first title success playing under the German flag came at 2010 Lambertz Open.

Brown made his Grand Slam debut at 2010 Wimbledon after receiving direct entry into the main draw. He lost in the first round to 16th seed Jürgen Melzer in four sets. After another ATP quarterfinal at the 2010 Hall of Fame Open, Brown received direct entry into the 2010 US Open and won his opening match against Rubén Ramírez Hidalgo to record his first Grand Slam win. He lost in the second round to world No. 4 Andy Murray in straight sets.

In September 2010, Brown won his first ATP doubles title at the 2010 Open de Moselle partnering Rogier Wassen.

Brown won his second ATP doubles title at the 2012 Grand Prix Hassan II partnering Paul Hanley.

Brown partnered Jonathan Marray at the 2012 French Open; they lost in the first round. Brown/Marray also reached four Challenger tour finals in 2012, winning two in Bosnia and Italy.

At 2013 Wimbledon, Brown qualified for the main draw and went all the way to the third round defeating Guillermo García López and former champion Lleyton Hewitt before falling to Adrian Mannarino in straight sets.

At the 2014 U.S. Men's Clay Court Championships, Brown upset first seed and world number 9 John Isner in the second round to claim his first ever win over a top 10 player. He would lose to Sam Querrey in the next round.

In 2014 he achieved his most significant career win by defeating world No. 1 tennis player Rafael Nadal at the Halle Open as a wildcard.

At Wimbledon in 2015 Brown came through qualifying without dropping a set. After beating Yen-hsun Lu in the first round, Brown then upset, for the second time in his career, 10th seed and 2-time champion Rafael Nadal in four sets in the second round, before losing to Victor Troicki in four sets in the next round.

In January 2016, Brown played world number 1 Novak Djokovic at the Qatar Open. He lost in straight sets.

Brown reached his first singles semifinal on the ATP World Tour at the 2016 Open Sud de France after having lost eight consecutive quarterfinal matches. There, he lost against top seed and eventual champion Richard Gasquet in three sets.

Brown reached a career debut second round of the French Open in 2016.

After winning the 2016 Aegon Manchester Trophy, Brown received a wild card for the 2016 Wimbledon Championships. There, he beat Dušan Lajović in the first round before losing to Nick Kyrgios in the second. Both matches were decided in five sets.

Brown made his second ATP singles semifinal at the 2016 Swiss Open Gstaad but lost to top seed and eventual champion Feliciano López in three sets.

Brown competed in the first round of the 2016 Summer Olympics against Thomaz Bellucci of Brazil. Brown was leading 6–4, 4–4 when he went down with an ankle injury. Medical staff taped him, he returned to the match playing two points. Bellucci increased the score to 4–5 in the second set. Brown could not return play and retired in tears.

On October 10, 2016, Brown achieved a career-high Singles ranking of 64 and would end 2016 with a year end ranking of 72.

Brown upset world number 7 Marin Čilić at the 2017 Open Sud de France. He would retire after just one game of play against Benoît Paire in the next round due to a back injury.

Brown lost in straight sets to Andy Murray at Wimbledon in 2017 in the second round.

Brown qualified for the 2018 Australian Open in what would be his last grand slam to date. He lost to João Sousa in the first round in five sets.

At the 2018 Open Sud de France, Brown was one game away from defeating Nicolas Mahut in the first round, but he sustained a back injury and could not continue to play giving Mahut the victory. He left the court in tears.

In April 2019, Brown reclaimed an ATP Challenger singles title from three years previous at the Mouratoglou Open in Sophia Antipolis, winning the final over Filip Krajinović in straight sets.

On 13 June 2019, Brown upset compatriot and world No. 5 Alexander Zverev at the 2019 Stuttgart Open in the second round. Following this victory, he lost in a third-set tiebreaker to Félix Auger-Aliassime in the quarterfinal.

2020–present
Brown reached the qualifying competition of the 2020 French Open Qualifying and the 2021 Australian Open Qualifying before being eliminated both times.

Throughout 2021, Brown seemed to focus less on singles and more on doubles as he was competing in more doubles events than singles and was finding more success as he was reaching a handful of quarterfinals and semifinals in challenger events and ATP events.

Brown received a wildcard into the 2021 Stuttgart Open due to his performance in the previous edition. He lost in the first round to Nikoloz Basilashvili in straight sets. This was his last professional singles match.

In 2022, Brown stopped representing Germany and returned to representing Jamaica in tournaments.

Davis Cup
Brown made his Davis Cup debut for Jamaica in 2003 which would be the only time he played for Jamaica at the Davis Cup. He won 4 of 5 singles matches played and all 3 doubles matches played.

Brown only played one match for Germany in 2015 in the singles where he lost to Dominican Víctor Estrella Burgos in four sets.

Brown's combined record for Jamaica and Germany is 4–2 in singles and 3–0 in doubles giving him an overall record of 7–2.

Style of play
Brown is considered as a serve-and-volleyer as he is known for his big serves and lightly volleying the ball in once it is returned to him. His serve speed averages at around 190–205 km/h but has reached up to 220 km/h.

Brown's shotmaking style is very unorthodox as he mixes his shots up with hard-hitting groundstrokes to light drop shots which makes his opponents have to be ready for anything on every point. He is also known for his impressive trick shots where he hits very difficult shots from difficult positions. These shots include tweeners, behind-the-back shots, diving shots, down-the-line shots, jump shots, drop shots, etc. This causes his playing style to be highly entertaining to the crowd as most tennis fans call him one of the most entertaining players on the tour.

Brown is also known for his very fast returns and winners on both his forehand and his backhand and his net and volleying skills.

Performance timelines

Singles

Doubles 
Current through the 2023 Open 13 Provence.

ATP career finals

Doubles: 6 (2 titles, 4 runner-ups)

ATP Challenger and ITF Futures finals

Singles: 28 (11–17)

Doubles: 79 (42–37)

Record against top 10 players
Brown's match record against players who have been ranked in the top 10,with those who are active in boldface. 
Only ATP Tour and ATP Challenger main draw matches are considered.

Top 10 wins per season 
Brown has a  record against players who were, at the time the match was played, ranked in the top 10.

References

External links 

 
 
 

1984 births
Living people
Naturalized citizens of Germany
German male tennis players
German people of Jamaican descent
Jamaican male tennis players
Jamaican people of German descent
People from Celle
Tennis people from Lower Saxony
Olympic tennis players of Germany
Tennis players at the 2016 Summer Olympics
Tennis players at the 2003 Pan American Games
Pan American Games competitors for Jamaica